Krusenstern Island (and similar names) is a toponym honoring the Baltic German explorer Adam Johann von Krusenstern (1770–1846). It may refer to a number of places in the Pacific Ocean:

 Little Diomede Island (Inupiaq: Iŋaliq), Alaska, United States
 Ailuk Atoll, Marshall Islands
 Tikehau, Tuamotu Archipelago in French Polynesia
 Krusenstern Islands, a small group of islands in the Middendorff Bay
 Krusenstern Island" or "Krusenstern Reef," a phantom island in the Northwestern Hawaiian Islands

See also
 Krusenstern (disambiguation)